Lake Station may refer to:

Places
Lake Station, Indiana, United States
Lake Station, Michigan, United States
Lake Station, Missouri, United States

Transportation
Lake station (CTA), Chicago, Illinois
Lake station (Los Angeles Metro), California
Lake railway station, Isle of Wight, England
The Lakes railway station, Warwickshire, England